Durrajpur is a village situated at Kanpur Dehat district, Uttar Pradesh, India.  The village is 7 km from the sub-district Sikandra and 32 km from sub-district Mati. This village is 90 km from the main city Kanpur. The population of this village is around 900.

Transportation
Durrajpur is very well connected by both roadways and railways. Public and private bus service is available in the village within 5-10 km distance. The nearest railway station is Pukhrayan.

References

Villages in Kanpur Dehat district